Diocese of Fort Worth may refer to:
 Roman Catholic Diocese of Fort Worth
 Episcopal Diocese of Fort Worth, part of the Anglican Church in North America
 Episcopal Church in North Texas, a defunct diocese of the Episcopal Church now merged with the Diocese of Texas